Joshua "Josh" Viola is a science fiction/fantasy/horror writer best known for Denver Moon, The Bane of Yoto and his publishing company Hex Publishers. He is a 2021 Splatterpunk Award nominee (Psi-Wars: Classified Cases of Psychic Phenomena) and a 2022 Colorado Book Awards winner (Shadow Atlas: Dark Landscapes of the Americas).

Background

In 2012, Viola collaborated with Klayton and his music label/publisher, FiXT Music, where Viola is the author of the novels Blackstar and The Bane of Yoto.

He directed the “Unshakeable” animated music video for Celldweller.

Viola is owner of publishing house Hex Publishers. He edited their Denver Post number one best selling horror anthology, Nightmares Unhinged, featuring Bram Stoker, Hugo and Nebula Award winners such as Jason Heller, Steve Rasnic Tem, Edward Bryant and Stephen Graham Jones. He co-edited Cyber World, a cyberpunk anthology, with Jason Heller for Hex Publishers in 2016, which was a 2017 Colorado Book Award finalist and named one of the best anthologies of 2016 by Barnes & Noble. Blood Business, a paranormal crime anthology co-edited by Mario Acevedo, was a 2018 Colorado Book Award finalist. In 2019, his comic book collection, Denver Moon: Metamorphosis, was included on the 2018 Bram Stoker Award Preliminary Ballot for Superior Achievement in a Graphic Novel. He was nominated for his fourth Colorado Book Award in April 2020 for his Denver Moon sequel, The Saint of Mars, a year after the first book, The Minds of Mars, was nominated for the 2019 award. In 2021, he edited the StokerCon™ souvenir anthology for the Horror Writers Association's first online convention (due to the COVID-19 pandemic), which included the 2020 Bram Stoker Awards. His 2020 anthology, Psi-Wars, was nominated for a 2021 Splatterpunk Award (award founded by Wrath James White and Brian Keene). He won the 2022 Colorado Book Award in the Anthology category for Shadow Atlas, co-edited by Carina Bissett and Hillary Dodge. In 2022, he became the Creative Director of Novelization and Comics for Random Games' Unioverse videogame franchise launched by a team of gaming and entertainment industry veterans behind titles such as Grand Theft Auto, Donkey Kong Country, and Crackdown. He is working directly with Brent Friedman, a master storyteller whose previous credits include writing on Star Wars: The Clone Wars, Halo 4, The Walking Dead, Call of Duty, and Star Trek: Enterprise.

Bibliography

Novels
 The Bane of Yoto with Nicholas Karpuk (FiXT, 2012)
 Blackstar (FiXT, 2015)
 The Bane of Yoto Re-Write with Mario Acevedo and Nicholas Karpuk (Hex Publishers, 2022)

Novellas
 Denver Moon: The Minds of Mars with Warren Hammond (Hex Publishers, 2018)
 Denver Moon: The Saint of Mars with Warren Hammond (Hex Publishers, 2019)
 Denver Moon: The Thirteen of Mars with Warren Hammond (Hex Publishers, 2022)

Anthologies edited
 Nightmares Unhinged (Hex Publishers, 2015)
 Cyber World with Jason Heller (Hex Publishers, 2016)
 Georgetown Haunts and Mysteries with Jeanne Stein (Hex Publishers & Ghost Town Writers Retreat, 2017)
 Blood Business: Crime Stories from this World and Beyond with Mario Acevedo (Hex Publishers, 2017)
 Psi-Wars: Classified Cases of Psychic Phenomena (Hex Publishers, 2020)
 It Came From The Multiplex: 80s Midnight Chillers (Hex Publishers & Colorado Festival of Horror, 2020)
 StokerCon™ 2021 Souvenir Anthology: The Phantom Denver Edition (Hex Publishers/Horror Writers Association, 2021)
 Shadow Atlas: Dark Landscapes of the Americas with Carina Bissett and Hillary Dodge (Hex Publishers, 2021)
 Unioverse: Stories of the Reconvergence with Angie Hodapp (Hex Publishers/Random Games, 2023)

Comic books
 Tooth and Claw with Angie Hodapp and Aaron Lovett (Hex Publishers, 2017)
 Denver Moon: Murder on Mars with Warren Hammond and Aaron Lovett (Hex Publishers, 2018)
 Denver Moon: Rafe's Revenge with Warren Hammond and Aaron Lovett (Hex Publishers, 2018)
 Denver Moon: Transformations with Warren Hammond and Aaron Lovett (Hex Publishers, 2018)
 Denver Moon: Metamorphosis with Warren Hammond and Aaron Lovett (Hex Publishers, 2018)
 Unioverse: Reyu with Angie Hodapp and Ben Matsuya (Hex Publishers/Random Games, 2023)
 Unioverse: Krishah with Angie Hodapp and Ben Matsuya (Hex Publishers/Random Games, 2023)
 Unioverse: Tor Gret with Angie Hodapp and Ben Matsuya (Hex Publishers/Random Games, 2023)
 Unioverse: Annill with Angie Hodapp and Ben Matsuya (Hex Publishers/Random Games, 2023)
 Unioverse: Vella Janx with Angie Hodapp and Ben Matsuya (Hex Publishers/Random Games, 2023)
 Unioverse: Silas with Angie Hodapp and Ben Matsuya (Hex Publishers/Random Games, 2023)

Children's books
 Boomer and Friends! with Lindsey Bell and Aaron Lovett (JAM Publishers, 2017)

Short stories
  "Luna One" (Hex Publishers, 2014)
  "The Camera" (Hex Publishers, 2015)
  "The Librarian" (Hex Publishers, 2015)
  "Needles" with Dean Wyant (Hex Publishers, 2015)
  "Scarecrows" (Hex Publishers, 2015)
  "Fangs" as J.V. Kyle (Hex Publishers, 2015)
  "Bathroom Break" as J.V. Kyle (Hex Publishers, 2015)
  "Finder's Fee" (RMFW Press, 2016)
  "Outsorcery" (The Literary Hatchet, 2016)
  "Notches" with Sean Eads (Blood Bound Books, 2017)
  "Straight to the Top" as Trevor Jones (Hex Publishers, 2017)
 "Denver Moon: Metamorphosis" with Warren Hammond (Hex Publishers, 2018)
  "For the Road is Heaven" with Sean Eads (Hex Publishers, 2018)
  "Our Hero" with Sean Eads (RMFW Press, 2018)
 "Many Carvings" with Sean Eads (Corpus Press, 2018)
 "Eunuch's Code" with Sean Eads (Blood Bound Books, 2019)
 "Grave Mistake" with Carter Wilson (Denver Horror Collective, 2019)
 "BFG" with Sean Eads (Birdy Magazine, 2020)
 "The Sommelier" with Sean Eads (Birdy Magazine, 2020)
 "Bright Rain" with Sean Eads (Birdy Magazine, 2020)
 "The Jarheads" with Sean Eads (Hex Publishers, 2020)
 "The Devil's Reel" with Sean Eads (Hex Publishers, 2020)
 "The Recall" (Bloodshot Books, 2020)
 "When the Trumpet Sounds" (Birdy Magazine, 2020)
 "Flashpoints" with Keith Ferrell (Birdy Magazine, 2021)
 "The Disciple of Many Faces" (Birdy Magazine, 2021)
 "Diminished Seventh" with Sean Eads (Black Spot Books/Crystal Lake Publishing, July 2022)
 "Ballad of the Overeager Gun" with Sean Eads (Brigids Gate Press, August 2022)

Anecdotes
  "Introduction: Reclaim Your Fears" (Hex Publishers, 2015)
 "Cyber Punks" (Locus Magazine, 2016)
  "Introduction: Metamorphosis" (Hex Publishers, 2016)
 "The Holy Appendix" as Jay Vee (Birdy Magazine, Issue 083, 2020)

References

External links
, Westword

21st-century American novelists
American male novelists
Living people
1983 births
Writers from Denver
American science fiction writers
21st-century American male writers
Novelists from Colorado